Rick McKay Gundrum is an American politician and businessman.  A Republican, he represents the 58th district of the Wisconsin State Assembly.

Biography
Gundrum lives in Slinger, Wisconsin, and is the owner of McKay Enterprises, an audio-visual company. Gundrum served on the Slinger Village Board and on the Washington County Board of Supervisors. He served as chairman of the county board. Gundrum was elected to the Wisconsin Assembly in a special election on January 15, 2018, replacing Bob Gannon who died while in office in October 2017. Gundrum is a Republican.

References

External links
 

Year of birth unknown
Living people
People from Slinger, Wisconsin
Businesspeople from Wisconsin
Wisconsin city council members
County supervisors in Wisconsin
Republican Party members of the Wisconsin State Assembly
21st-century American politicians
Year of birth missing (living people)